The 2013–14 Copa Catalunya is the 25th staging of the Copa Catalunya. The competition began on June 1, 2013.

Tournament

First phase

First round

Second round

Third round

Second phase

First round
Bye: Prat

Second round

Third round
Bye: Castelldefels

Fourth round
Bye: Figueres

Fifth round
Bye: Ascó

Sixth round

Semifinals

Final

External links
Federació Catalana de Futbol 

Cata
Copa Catalunya seasons
Copa